Mario Sitri (29 January 1936 – 3 August 2011) was an Italian boxer. He competed in the men's bantamweight event at the 1956 Summer Olympics.

References

1936 births
2011 deaths
Italian male boxers
Olympic boxers of Italy
Boxers at the 1956 Summer Olympics
Sportspeople from Livorno
Bantamweight boxers
20th-century Italian people